Stoneypath Tower, is an L-plan tower house dating from the late sixteenth century, about  south of East Linton, and east of the Whittinghame Water in East Lothian, Scotland.

History

Stoneypath Tower was at first a property of the Lyles, but passed thereafter in succession to the Hamiltons of Innerwick, the Douglases of  Whittinghame, and the Setons.  At some stage it may have been blown up. By the later 19th century the building was in ruins, though in the early 21st century it was fully restored.

Structure

The tower stands on a promontory defended by steep slopes on three sides.  It may include part of a keep built in the previous century.  The original entrance, approached by an external stair, has been sealed.  A turnpike stair reached all floors.  On the second floor was the hall.  The thickness of the wall enclosed a prison. The keep is built of rubble, with some freestone dressings.  There were originally three storeys.  The wing contained two chambers.

See also
List of places in East Lothian
List of places in Scotland

References

Castles in East Lothian
Tower houses in Scotland
16th-century establishments in Scotland